Baroness Wilhelmine Caroline Christiane Henriette of Dörnberg, (German: Wilhelmine Caroline Christiane Henriette, Reichsfreiin von Dörnberg; 6 March 1803 – 14 May 1835) was a member of the House of Dörnberg and a Baroness of Dörnberg by birth. Through her marriage to Maximilian Karl, 6th Prince of Thurn and Taxis, Wilhelmine  was also a member of the House of Thurn and Taxis. Wilhelmine was known to her family and friends as "Mimi."

Early life
Wilhelmine was the daughter of the former Prussian Vice President and Director of the royal chamber of Brandenburg-Ansbach, Baron Ernst Heinrich Konrad Friedrich von Dörnberg (1769-1828) and his wife Baroness Wilhelmine Sophie Henriette Maximiliane von Glauburg (1775-1835). She had two elder siblings, a brother, Count Ernst Friedrich von Dörnberg (1801-1878) and one sister, Countess Sophie von Pückler-Limpurg (1795-1854).

Marriage and issue
Wilhelmine married Maximilian Karl, 6th Prince of Thurn and Taxis, fourth child of Karl Alexander, 5th Prince of Thurn and Taxis and his wife Duchess Therese of Mecklenburg-Strelitz, on 24 August 1828 in Regensburg. Wilhelmine and Maximilian Karl had five children:

Prince Karl Wilhelm of Thurn and Taxis (14 April 1829 – 21 July 1829)
Princess Therese Mathilde of Thurn and Taxis (31 August 1830 – 10 September 1883) ⚭ Duke Carl Alfred August Konstantin von Beaufort-Spontin
Maximilian Anton Lamoral, Hereditary Prince of Thurn and Taxis (28 September 1831 – 26 June 1867) ⚭ Duchess Helene in Bavaria
Prince Egon of Thurn and Taxis (17 November 1832 – 8 February 1892) ⚭ Viktoria Edelspacher de Gyorok
Prince Theodor of Thurn and Taxis (9 February 1834 – 1 March 1876) ⚭ Baroness Melanie von Seckendorff

Wilhelmine's family, the House of Dörnberg, was a Protestant Hessian noble family and was not, according to the laws of the Princely House of Thurn and Taxis Family Act of 1776, equal in rank to her husband's family. Despite the fierce resistance to the union from the members of the princely house, especially from Maximilian Karl's mother Therese, the two married.

Wilhelmine's brother, Baron Ernst Friedrich von Dörnberg (1801-1878), became chief of the Thurn and Taxis administration and was elevated to the title of Graf von Dörnberg (Count of Dörnberg) in Vienna on February 21, 1865.

Illness and death
In 1834, Wilhelmine fell ill on a hard drive to Castle Chraustowitz, one of the many estates that Thurn and Taxis family possessed in Bohemia. At the beginning of 1835, she went to Nuremberg to receive a homeopathic treatment with Dr. Reuter. Wilhelmine was hopeful that the treatments would restore her quality of life. However, she died on 14 May 1835.

Ancestry

References

Martin Dallmeier, Martha Schad: Das Fürstliche Haus Thurn und Taxis. Friedrich Pustet Verlag Regensburg 1996.

1803 births
1835 deaths
People from Ansbach
Princesses of Thurn und Taxis
German baronesses
German Roman Catholics
Burials at the Gruftkapelle, St. Emmeram's Abbey